Mordellistena marginalis is a species of beetles is the family Mordellidae.

References

marginalis
Beetles described in 1824